Proposition 8 may refer to:

California Proposition 8 (2008), which added a ban on same-sex marriage to the state Constitution
California Proposition 8 (1982), which provided additional rights to crime victims
California Proposition 8 (1978), relating to the reassessment of property during a decline in value
California Proposition 8 (1911), which introduced the recall of public officials
Texas Proposition 8 (2007), relating to home equity loans